Raciu is a commune in Dâmbovița County, Muntenia, Romania. It is composed of three villages: Raciu, Siliștea, and Șuța Seacă. These were part of Lucieni Commune from 1968 to 2004, when they were split off to re-establish a separate commune.

References

Communes in Dâmbovița County
Localities in Muntenia